Bidhayak Bhattacharya (7 February 1907 – 15 November 1986) was a Bengali novelist, play writer and actor. His birth name was Bagalaranjan.

Early life
Bhattacharya was born at Ziaganj in Murshidabad district in 1907 in British India. His father's name is Haricharan Bhattacharya. In 1937, Rabindranath Tagore called him in a new name as Bidhayak. He passed entrance from Raja Bijoy Singh Vidyamandir of Ziaganj. Thereafter he came Kolkata in 1929 and joined in Amrita Bazar Patrika as journalist. He became popular as theater personality after the release of Meghmukti in 1938. Bhattacharya started his career in All India Radio, Kolkata under the guidance of Kazi Nazrul Islam.

Literary career
He was the writer of the story of several Bengali films namely Krishna Kaveri, Akash Ar Mati, Dhuli, Matir Ghar and Prithibi Amare Chay. He also directed the film Krishna Kaveri in 1949. Bhattacharya wrote number of Bengali novel and short stories in various magazine. He published more than thirty successful plays. Bhattacharya created a famous Bengali character Amaresh. He received Sudhangshubala award in 1967 conferred by the Calcutta University for his literary works.

Filmography
 Bhranti Bilas
 Deya Neya
 Tridhara
 Abak Prithibi
 Uttar Megh
 Abasheshe
 Gayer Meye
 Sudha

References

External links
 

1907 births
1986 deaths
20th-century Indian dramatists and playwrights
20th-century Indian male writers
Indian male dramatists and playwrights
Indian theatre directors
20th-century Indian male actors
Male actors from Kolkata
Male actors from West Bengal
Bengali novelists
People from Murshidabad district
West Bengal
Dramatists and playwrights from West Bengal